God's Project is the fourth studio album released by Bachata group Aventura. It was released on April 26, 2005, by Premium Latin Music and distributed by Sony Latin Music. The album production was based on bachata with elements of Rock, merengue and mordem and urban music such as R&B, exploring new sounds with Reggaeton with an Urban hip-hop Black American flavor. This combination of rhythms was classified by some critics as "neo-bachata". It features guest appearances by Judy Santos, Anthony Santos, Nina Sky and reggaeton superstars Tego Calderon and Don Omar.

The title of the album made reference that it was God's idea that each member of the band ended up doing music together. On the intro track, appeared the mothers of each member explain and made stories about their initials on music when they were children. The album contains sixteen tracks, including one intro, two skits, and one hidden track. It explored lyrics of romance, sex, love, cheating, and Infidelity. Like their previous albums, it contains social conscience lyrics on songs like "La Niña". The album cover features Romeo, Henry, Lenny, and Max from left to right when they were infants.

God`s Project receive positive reviews by critics and was praised for the band their skills as a musician and their improvement in production.  It won "Album of The Year" at 2006's Soberano Awards, previously known as the Casandra Awards. Following the success of the album, the band won two awards at Premio Lo Nuestro 2006 for Best Tropical Duo or Group and Traditional. Also, it won Tropical Album Of The Year and Song of The Year Duo Or Group at the 2006 Billboard Latin Music Awards. The album was supported by the release of four official singles: Angelito, La Boda, Ella y Yo and Un Beso.

God`s Project is considered Aventura's mainstream breakthrough album. It remained the top-selling album on the chart for 7 consecutive weeks in 2005 and 5 non-consecutive weeks in 2006 Billboard Tropical Albums. It debut at the Top 5 of Billboard Top Latin Album and was certified four-time platinum (Latin field) in the United States by the Recording Industry Association of America (RIAA). Two of the four album singles reached the Top 10 on the US Hot Latin Songs chart. Eventually, it was the best-selling tropical album of 2006 in the United States. The album peaked at the Top 40 of France and Italian album charts and at the Top 20 in Ecuador. In Switzerland, it reached two spots and was certified gold. Eventually, it sold over half a million of copies worldwide. To promote the album, Aventura embarked on a highly successful tour selling out venues like New York's Madison Square Garden, Altos de Chavon and Coliseo de Puerto Rico.

Background and promotion 
God`s Project was the band`s first album to be distributed by Sony Latin Music. In 2002, Aventura`s second studio We Broke The Rules sold over 1.5 million copies worldwide and the single Obsesion was a commercial success in Europe and Latin America. Following that, Aventura played about 140 dates per year combined in the United States, Europe, and the Caribbean, sharing the stage with a host of major acts. In 2003, the album's third album Love & Hate was successful but sales figures were lower than their previous album. In the United States, We Broke the Rules sold only 69,000, according to Nielsen SoundScan, and "Love and Hate" 48,000 as of 2005. With the new Sony Distribution, expectations were high. According to the manager band, Johnny Marines, citing presence in mass-merchant accounts and on Internet sites, explained "When you add them all up, they add up to something big" and "Sony has opened the doors for many forms of promotion we didn't have in the past".

Reception

Critical response 
The album receive positive reviews by the critics. Evan C. Gutierrez from Allmusic gave four out five stars and praise the album production and innovation. About the musical skills of some the member of the band the writer explained "Under the clever guise of a boy band lurks some genuine musicianship, particularly evident in Lenny and Mikey Santos. The musician's ear will delight in Lenny's skillful guitar playing and tasteful, hip production, which foreshadow a long, fruitful career in the industry". However, the writer critics the albums's stylistically homogeneous and lack of instrumentation. However, he explained that "t is exactly their dedication to their Dominican heritage and an original sound that has saved them from pop mediocrity" and named God's Project as "the most consistent in quality so far and perhaps their strongest release period, establishes them as more than a pop phenomenon"

Commercial performance 
Pre-orders off the album were over 125,000 before it release date. In the United States, God's Project debuted at number three on the Billboard Tropical Albums on the week of May 14, 2005 selling over 7,600 copies. The next week it peaked at number one on the chart and remained there for seven consecutive weeks. Also, it peaked at number five on Billboard Top Latin Album and at 133 US Billboard 200. It was the best selling tropical album of 2006 in the United States. As of 2009, it sold 316,000 copies. Eventaully, it was certified four times platinum (Latin field) by RIAA for shipping 400,000 copies in the United States. In Switzerland the album peaked at number two and was certified gold for shipping 20,000 copies. Also, It peaked on number 20 on Frances albums charts and 32 on Italian album charts. It peaked at number 18 on Ecuador album retail charts. God's Project sold more than half a million of copies worldwide.

Track listing 

The original version of the album, "Envidia" is a hidden track inside the song "You're Lying". The original version of the song was from Tego Calderon's compilation album El Enemy De Los Guasibiri which also featured Aventura.

Charts

Weekly charts

Year-end charts

Sales and certifications

See also
List of number-one Billboard Tropical Albums from the 2000s

References

External links
Aventura official site

2005 albums
Aventura (band) albums